De Stilte van het Naderen  (English title: Silence of the Soul) is a 2000 Dutch film directed by Stephan Brenninkmeijer.

Plot
When Jules Brasschaert, convicted and jailed for a crime he has committed several years ago, is pardoned he is a changed man. He found his peace with the help of his belief in God.
After a chance meeting with this man, Susan burns her bridges to be with him.
As it turns out she is to redeem herself of a childhood trauma.
While this is going on, Susan's fiancée is losing grips on his steady and well planned life and shows his true face.

Cast
 - Susan
 - Jules
Ronald Top - David

Awards
'Silence of the Soul' Won the 'Golden Crown Award' for Best Foreign Film at the ICVM festival, Atlanta USA in 2001.

External links 
 
 

Dutch thriller drama films
2000 films
2000s Dutch-language films